WXBM-FM (102.7 MHz) is a country music formatted radio station in the Milton, Pensacola, Gulf Shores owned by Cumulus Media Inc. through licensee Cumulus Licensing LLC. Its studios are located in Pensacola and its transmitter is located near Robertsdale, Alabama.

External links

XBM-FM
Country radio stations in the United States
Cumulus Media radio stations
1964 establishments in Florida
Radio stations established in 1964